Taipusi Banner (Mongolian:   , Khalkha: Тайвас хошуу, Taiwas hoshuu) is a banner of Inner Mongolia, China, bordering Hebei province to the southeast, south, and west. It is under the administration of Xilin Gol League and is its southernmost county-level division.

Baochang Town, whose Mongolian name is also an transliteration of the corresponding Chinese name, is the banner-seat.

Climate

References

www.xzqh.org 

Banners of Inner Mongolia